Faroe Islands is one of the 12 multi-member constituencies of the Folketing, the national legislature of Denmark. The constituency represents the Faroe Islands between the North Sea and the Atlantic Ocean.

2022 
2022 Danish general election:

2019 
2019 Danish general election:

References

See also 

 List of Faroese members of the Folketing
 Constituencies of Denmark

Politics of the Faroe Islands
Folketing constituencies